Fort Abbas  is a tehsil located in Bahawalnagar District, Punjab, Pakistan.

History

The area currently encompassed by Fort Abbas Tehsil was a thriving center of ancient Hakra civilization. A survey of the Cholistan region from 1947 to 1977 dated Hakra ceramics to 5000 BCE.

Geography

Fort Abbas Tehsil has an area of 2,536 km2.

Adjacent tehsils
Haroonabad Tehsil (northeast)
Anupgarh Tehsil, Sri Ganganagar District, Rajasthan, India (northeast)
Gharsana Tehsil, Sri Ganganagar District, Rajasthan, India (southeast)
Khajuwala Tehsil, Bikaner District, Rajasthan, India (southwest)
Yazman Tehsil, Bahawalpur District (west)

Demographics

According to the 2017 Census of Pakistan there were 423,529 people living in Fort Abbas Tehsil and 67,121 households. Its population in 1998 was 285,596.

References

Bahawalnagar District
Tehsils of Punjab, Pakistan